Kamat is a surname from Goa, Maharashtra and coastal Karnataka in India. It is found among Hindus of the Goud Saraswat Brahmin, Saraswat and Rajapur Saraswat Brahmin communities following Madhva Sampradaya of either Gokarna Matha or Kashi Matha.

Variations 
Kāmat is a common surname of Konkani Saraswat Brahmins and of a few Konkani Christians of Goa, Maharashtra, Damaon & Canara. "Kāmat" is mostly used in the Konkan area which includes Goa, Maharashtra and around the North Canara district in Karnataka. Kāmath is used by Brahmins around Dakshina Kannada and Udupi districts and of Karnataka and Hosdurg in Kerala. The word has origin in the Sanskrit word of "Kāmati" (i.e. Kaam + Maati) meaning "people who work in soil" or do farming or cultivate land. "Camotim" was used in the erstwhile Portuguese Goa but has given way to "Kāmat" today. "Camat" word is still in use in Indonesia which was a Portuguese colony at some point of time in the history. In Indonesia "Camat" means administrative and political head of the sub-district or taluk. Taluk may be said as kecamatan (spelled as ke-chamatan). The name is also in use among some Konkani Catholics who trace their ancestry to the Goud Saraswat Brahmins of Goa.

There are many GSB and RSB families, original "Kāmats" from Goa who migrated to Karnataka and Maharashtra in the 16th Century to escape Catholic persecution of Hindus under Portuguese rule and they adopted the place name from Goa where they originally belonged to.

Notable people

The following is a list of notable people with last name Kāmat.

 Digambar Kamat, Chief Minister of Goa (2007 to 2012)
 Durgabai Kamat (1899–1997), first actress of Indian cinema, debuted in Mohini Bhasmasur (1913), second movie of Phalke
 Ninad Kamat, Marathi and Hindi actor
 Umesh Kamat, Marathi actor

See also
Christian Brahmins
Christian Kshatriyas

Citations

References
.

Indian surnames
Karnataka society
Konkani-language surnames